Danionella priapus is a species of Danionella endemic to India. It is sexually dimorphic and, like other species in the genus, possesses a skeleton with fewer bones than the closely related zebrafish. However, it has a number of distinguishing features which differentiate it from others in the genus, with the most notable example being the conically projecting genital papilla between the funnel-shaped pelvic fins of males.

References

priapus
Cyprinid fish of Asia
Fish described in 2009